Ina Christine Wroldsen (born 29 May 1984), previously known simply as Ina, is a Norwegian singer and songwriter. She was a part of the electropop duo Ask Embla with Icelandic producer and songwriter Arnthor Birgisson.

Career 
Wroldsen's career started solely as a recording artist, but soon turned to writing music for others. As a songwriter, she has had great success and is internationally considered one of the most sought after in her field. She has won several BMI/ASCAP awards for her work, among BRIT award and Spellemannprisen nominations. Her songs have been used by the likes of Shakira, David Guetta, James Arthur, Britney Spears, Demi Lovato, Madison Beer and Tinie Tempah.

Between 2013 and 2018, the publishing interest of Ina Wroldsen's catalog has been represented by Reverb Music/Reservoir Media Management. Since 2018, Warner Chappell Music have represented Ina's publishing interests.

In recent years, Ina has also resumed her career as a recording artist. As part of Norwegian-Icelandic duo Ask Embla, together with Arnthor Birgisson. They released the album Northern Lights in 2013 in Norway. She has since continued her artist career under its own name. She released "Aliens (Her er jeg)" (2014), "Rebels" (2015) and "Lay It on Me" (2016). The latter was released as a collaboration with the Norwegian producer duo Broiler and climbed to No. 2 on the VG-lista singles chart.

In 2015, Calvin Harris and Disciples chose to release Ina's song "How Deep Is Your Love" using her vocals. This was one of the year's most streamed/downloaded/played songs worldwide.

In 2016, she was one of the judges in the Norwegian version of Idol: Jakten på en superstjerne.
She has been the featured vocalist on various worldwide acclaimed DJs' records, including Sigma, Steve Aoki, "Breathe" by Jax Jones and the Martin Solveig song "Places".

In June 2017, she signed a record deal with Simon Cowell's Syco Music label. Soon after, on 27 October 2017, she released her single "Strongest", which was quite successful in Norway, Denmark, and Sweden, and thanks to it in 2019 she was nominated for Spellemannprisen for the "Song of the Year" award.

In August 2018, she released in partnership with Alok "Favela" with her own vocals and inspired from a documentary about Latin American women.

Discography

Extended plays

Singles

As main artist

As featured artist

Other songs

Credits

Singing-songwriting

Songwriting

Awards and nominations

References

External links 

 

1984 births
Living people
Musicians from Sandefjord
Norwegian songwriters
21st-century Norwegian singers
21st-century Norwegian women singers